Sam Hallas (born 18 October 1996) is an English professional rugby league footballer who plays as a  or  for the Hunslet RLFC in the RFL League 1.

Background
Hallas was born in Leeds, West Yorkshire, England.

Playing career

Leeds Rhinos
Hallas signed for the Leeds Rhinos Under 15s from amateur club Stanningley ARLFC and went on to captain Leeds' under 19s. He made his first team début for Leeds in 2016 at the Magic Weekend vs Wigan Warriors, playing as a hooker after previously playing at prop in the academy.

Hallas made four appearances for Leeds before joining Bradford Bulls on an initial month loan deal in February 2017 which was extended to the end of the season.

Bradford Bulls
Near the end of the 2017 season, Hallas made his move to the Bulls permanent by signing a two-year deal. He signed an extension at the end of the 2019 season.

Newcastle Thunder
On 9 November 2021, it was reported that he had signed for Newcastle Thunder in the RFL Championship

International career
Hallas played for England Academy at youth level where he was made captain.

Personal life
Hallas is the son of former Hunslet rugby league player Steven Hallas, and nephew of Graeme Hallas, who played for clubs such as Hull Kingston Rovers and Halifax RLFC.

References

External links
Bradford Bulls profile
 Leeds Rhinos Academy profile

1996 births
Living people
Bradford Bulls captains
Bradford Bulls players
English rugby league players
Hunslet R.L.F.C. players
Leeds Rhinos players
Newcastle Thunder players
Rugby league locks
Rugby league hookers
Rugby league players from Leeds